Kess Film is a production company founded in 2014 in Berlin, Germany by Italian producer, screenwriter and actor Giulio Baraldi. Its primary aim is to assist young directors and screenwriters in the process of realizing TV series and Art House films from the start of preparation onwards.

Reise nach Jerusalem 
Reise nach Jerusalem (The Chairs Game) is a feature film directed by Lucia Chiarla starring German actress Eva Löbau. It was produced by Kess Film and released in German cinemas on November 15, 2018. The film  won the awards for Best Film and Best Actress at Achtung Berlin Film Festival and for Best Film at the 7th Boddinale Film Festival.

Giulio Baraldi 
Giulio Baraldi ( Born April 2, 1971, in Milan) is primary a stage actor  and founder of Kess Film. He also acted in film productions like Tale Padre, Shooting, A casa nostra  and Fame chimica  in 2003. His credits as a screenwriter and producer include Suddenly Komir and the documentary film Dust: The Wanted Life released on November 22, 2015.

References

External links 

 Kess Film Official website
 Kess Film on IMDb
 Kess Film on Cinando
 Reise nach Jerusalem Official website

Film production companies of Germany